Janka Kulcsár (born 8 April 1985) is a Hungarian pianist and répétiteur, and a founding member of the Moltopera Company.

Life

Early life
Janka Kulcsár was born on 8 April 1985 in Budapest. Kulcsár entered the Béla Bartók Conservatory at the age of fourteen. She participated frequently in summer courses during this period, like the International Music Camp in Balassagyarmat. At the age of eighteen she had already been a student of the Franz Liszt Academy of Music, coached by Lehel Both, at the age of twenty she won the 1st prize of the National Piano Competition for University Students. In the next year, she won a prize in the National Chamber Music Competition. Kulcsár works mainly with singers. She accompanied Marianna Sipos in the ARD International Music Competition in 2012.

Moltopera
Founding member of the Moltopera Company since 2011. She accompanied among others Moltopera's production Don Giovanni, Magic Flute (in the Palace of Arts), Fledermaus, La Bohéme, Cavalleria Rusticana, Menotti's: The telephone, L'enfant et les sortiléges (in the National Theater of Pécs), and How to survive an opera recital? (in the Sziget Festival).

Awards
National Piano Competition for University Students - I. prize
Prize at the National Chamber Music Competition

Sources
Kulcsár Janka a Moltopera hivatalos honlapján
Kulcsár Janka profilja a MusiciansWho-n

1985 births
Living people
Musicians from Budapest
Hungarian pianists
21st-century pianists